Björn Borg (14 November 1919 – 13 April 2009) was a Swedish swimmer. He competed at the 1936 Summer Olympics in the 4 × 200 m freestyle and 100 m backstroke and finished eighth in the relay. He won the 400 m and 1500 m freestyle events at the 1938 European Aquatics Championships and was awarded the Svenska Dagbladet Gold Medal the same year. In 1959, Borg moved to Switzerland, where he worked as a businessman. He died in Zürich aged 89.

References

1919 births
2009 deaths
Swedish male freestyle swimmers
Swedish male backstroke swimmers
Male long-distance swimmers
Olympic swimmers of Sweden
Swimmers at the 1936 Summer Olympics
European Aquatics Championships medalists in swimming
20th-century Swedish people
21st-century Swedish people